Queens Surface Corporation was a bus company in New York City, United States, operating local service in Queens and the Bronx and express service between Queens and Manhattan until February 27, 2005, when the MTA Bus Company took over the operations. The company was known for its orange paint scheme, used since the company's inception in the late 1930s.

Queens Surface Corporation was privately held by the Gordon and Burke families. The Queens Surface Corporation facility was located at 128-15 28th Avenue in the College Point neighborhood of Queens.

History

New York and Queens County Railway
The New York and Queens County Railway (NY&QC) became the largest trolley line in Queens in 1896, through the consolidating of four previous streetcar operators: Flushing and College Point Electric Railway, Long Island City and Newtown Railway, Newtown Railway, and the original Steinway Railway Company. It served Long Island City, Woodside, Astoria, North Beach, College Point, Jamaica, and even the Queensboro Bridge. Between 1903 and 1922, the NY&QC became an affiliate of the Interborough Rapid Transit Company. On June 24, 1930, the Woodside Car barn was hit with a massive fire that destroyed much of their fleet, along with the fleet of their competitors, the Steinway Railway (see below).

Steinway Railway

The Steinway Railway operated in northwestern Queens in 1892, through the merger of the Rikers Avenue and Sanford Point Railroad and Steinway and Hunters Point Railroad, only to be acquired by NY&QC in 1896. As NY&QC faced bankruptcy in 1922, it began to sell off Steinway as a somewhat independent company. It was actually bought by the Third Avenue Railway System but was allowed to operate under its own name.

Bustitution and re-merging
On February 19, 1926, NY&QC established a bus division called the Queens-Nassau Transit Lines. Queens-Nassau buses replaced all NY&QC trolleys by 1937, with the last being motorized on October 30 of that year. In the Fall of 1938, the Steinway Railway was bought by Queensboro Bridge Railway Company and renamed as Steinway Omnibus. Steinway began operating buses over former Steinway Railway lines on September 29, 1939. Both companies were operated by the same management, and casually referred to as the "orange buses". Queens-Nassau was renamed Queens Transit Corporation in 1957, and Steinway Omnibus became Steinway Transit in 1959. The two companies merged again in 1986 to form the Queens/Steinway Transit Corporation. The joint company was owned by the H.E. Salzberg Company (scrap metal and short-haul railways) with father Harold Salzberg, son Murray M. Salzberg (1915-1984, aged 69) and grandson Harry Salzberg, which had ripped up the rails, running these two companies until 1988, when the Linden Bus Company acquired the routes from the aging grandson Harry Salzberg. Shortly thereafter and before operations commenced, Linden Bus Company changed its name to Queens Surface Corporation.

On February 27, 2005, the MTA Bus Company took over the operations of the Queens Surface routes, part of the city's takeover of all the remaining privately operated bus routes.

Bus routes
Prior to MTA Bus takeover, Queens Surface operated the following routes that are now based in College Point Bus Depot, the LaGuardia Depot (the former Triboro Coach depot), and the Eastchester Depot (the former New York Bus Service depot in the Bronx).

Depots

Queens Surface depot

Queens Surface's depot was located at 128-15 28th Avenue in the College Point section of Queens, near the printing plant of The New York Times and the former site of Flushing Airport. It was built in 1997 by the NYCDOT, and leased to Queens Surface. Many buses under Queens Surface used compressed natural gas (CNG). It is now the College Point Depot of the MTA Bus Company.

Steinway Transit depot
The Steinway Transit depot, built in 1939, was located at the northwest corner of Steinway Street and 20th Avenue in Astoria, Queens, near the northern terminus of the company's  route. It was the successor to the Steinway Railway depot. The trolley depot sat across from the Daimler Manufacturing Company automobile factory, opened in 1890 by Gottlieb Daimler and local businessman William Steinway. The bus depot was closed prior to the company's takeover by the city, and has long been demolished, and replaced by new apartment buildings, similar to what was done at the old West Farms Depot site.

Woodside Garage
The Woodside Garage was located at 51-00 Northern Boulevard, at the southeast corner 51st Street and Northern Boulevard in Woodside, Queens, adjacent to the Winfield Junction of the Long Island Rail Road. It was the original headquarters of Queens-Nassau Transit. It was also the successor to the NY&QC Woodside Trolley Barn, which opened in 1896 and burned down on June 24, 1930. The front facade of the trolley barn survives as a Verizon store in the Tower Square Shopping Center.

References

Lost Trolleys of Queens and Long Island by Stephen L. Meyers, 2006

External links
Queens Surface Corp (via the Internet Archive)
New York and Queens County Railway and the Steinway Lines, 1867-1939, Internet Archive
Chicago Transit & Railfan Web Site: New York City Transit
Trolley Barn with Anchovies: Woodside's Trolley Terminal (Forgotten New York)

Transport companies established in 1926
Bus transportation in New York City
Defunct public transport operators in the United States
Transport companies disestablished in 2005
1926 establishments in New York (state)
2005 disestablishments in New York (state)